Artem Pryma (born 30 May 1987, Chernihiv, Ukrainian SSR) is a Ukrainian World Cup level biathlete. He participated at 2014 and 2018 Winter Olympics.

Career
Pryma began competing internationally in 2006 but he participated only in junior competitions. He debuted at World Cup on January 14, 2010, in German Ruhpolding where he was 41st in sprint. Then he started in relay together with his brother Roman but Roman screwed it up and had a penalty loop. Team finished 12th in that race. His first World Cup points he earned next year. At 2011 World Championships he was 25th in individual race.

At 2011 Winter Universiade in Erzurum, Turkey, he won four medals including two gold. Together with Serhiy Semenov and Vita Semerenko they were the most successful biathletes at those competitions. He is also 2011 European champion in individual race. In next seasons he also won some more European medals.

At 2014 Winter Olympics in Russian Sochi his best result was just 32nd in sprint.

He qualified to represent Ukraine at the 2018 Winter Olympics. In Pyeongchang he was 46th in individual, 40th in sprint and 38th in pursuit. He also participated in two relays being 7th in mixed relay and 9th in classical relay.

On March 10, 2018, Artem achieved his first World Cup podium. He was second in mixed relay in Kontiolahti, Finland.

Personal life
Roman Pryma who is a former biathlete and currently coach is Artem's elder brother.

Career results

Winter Olympics

World Championships

World Cup

Relay podiums

Rankings

IBU Cup

Individual podiums

Relay podiums

References
 Profile on biathlon.com.ua
 Profile in IBU Database

1987 births
Living people
Sportspeople from Chernihiv
Ukrainian male biathletes
Biathletes at the 2014 Winter Olympics
Biathletes at the 2018 Winter Olympics
Biathletes at the 2022 Winter Olympics
Olympic biathletes of Ukraine
Universiade medalists in biathlon
Universiade gold medalists for Ukraine
Universiade silver medalists for Ukraine
Competitors at the 2011 Winter Universiade
21st-century Ukrainian people